Pizza Nova Take Out Ltd., doing business as Pizza Nova, is a Canadian franchise chain of pizza restaurants headquartered in Scarborough, Toronto. The chain was founded on 12 May 1963 by a young family of Italian immigrants. The first restaurant was located in the eastern Toronto suburb of Scarborough, Ontario on Kennedy Road near Lawrence Avenue, which currently operates under the name Nova Ristorante.

There are more than 140 locations in Canada.
  
The Pizza Nova location in Varadero, Cuba is not related, but uses a similar logo formerly used by the Canadian company.

History
The chain was founded by a young family of Italian immigrants—consisting of Sam Primucci, and his brothers Mike, Vince, and Joe—originating from Basilicata, Italy. Their first location opened on 12 May 1963 at the corner of Lawrence Avenue East, just west of Kennedy Road.

Following many years of success in both their delivery and walk-in services, the restaurant opened their first franchised store in 1969.

Upon celebrating the company's 50th anniversary, the pizza chain also announced their partnership with the Toronto Blue Jays and the Rogers Centre as their official pizza supplier, starting in January 2014, and continuing for a three-year agreement.

Jingle
In October 1987, jingle writer Syd Kessler, advertising agency Montana Steele, and Pizza Nova President Sam Primucci produced an advertisement featuring the singing of the phone number and vocalising the quadruple zero as "4-3-9, Oh-Oh Oh-Oh Pizza Nova!" Sung by Canadian musician Zappacosta, edits of the original can still be heard on Ontario radio and TV today, with new voiceover by company President Domenic Primucci, son of founder Sam Primucci.

Products
Some of Pizza Nova's signature products include:

Signature pizzas

Banquet Cheddar
Calabrese
Deluxe
Napoletana
Primavera
Pizza Pollo
Porco Pazzo
Roasted Parma
Meat Supreme
Pepperoni
The All-Star
Quattro Stagioni
Mediterranean
Portabellissimo  
Super Gourmet
Super Hawaiian
Veggie
Cheddar Supreme

Pesto pizzas

Chicken Florentine
Tuscan Pesto

White pizzas

Bruschetta Pizza
Basilcata
California
Chicken Alla Bianca
Greek Bruschetta
Il Giardino
Porchetta and Hot Peppers
Spicy Porchetta
Nonna's favorite 

The beverages that Pizza Nova sells are Coca-Cola products. Pizza Nova has also become a go-to chain for vegans as it offers dairy-free cheese, and as of 2021, plant based pepperoni.

See also
List of Canadian pizza chains

References

External links

Official website

Pizza chains of Canada
Regional restaurant chains in Canada
Companies based in Scarborough, Toronto
Restaurants in Toronto